Acanthodesmos distichus is a species of the Asteraceae described as a genus and as a species in 1971. and is the only species in the monotypic genus Acanthodesmos.

Acanthodesmos  is endemic to Jamaica.

References 

Monotypic Asteraceae genera
Flora of Jamaica
Vernonieae